Michele Palazzi (born 27 November 1984) is an Italian photographer and World Press Photo prize winner.

Biography
Palazzi is an Italian photographer born in Rome. In 2007 he gained a three-year master's degree in Photography at the Scuola Romana di Fotografia. In 2013 he received the First Prize of Environmental Photographer of the Year Award by the Chartered Institution of Water and Environmental Management. Between 2012 and 2013 he started working on Black Gold Hotel a long term project about the modernization impact in Mongolia, which has been awarded with the First Prize in the Daily Life category - Stories of the World Press Photo 2015. In 2019 Palazzi published his first book, Finisterrae: terra di confine and in 2021 published the second one, Mongolia Felix with a text written by Giovanni Lindo Ferretti. He lives in Rome and he is represented by the Contrasto agency. He's currently working as a photography teacher at the Rome University of Fine Arts.

Publications
 Finisterrae: terra di confine. Livorno: Origini Edizioni, 2019. .
 Mongolia Felix Livorno: Origini Edizioni, 2021. .

Collections
Palazzi's work is held in the following public collections:
Bibliothèque nationale de France, Paris, FR: 1 print (as of January 2020)

Prizes and awards
2011 Center Awards “Migrant Workers Journey” 1st Prize Project Launch Award 
2013 Environmental Photographer of the Year “Gone with the Dust #02” 1st Prize Environmental Photographer of the Year Award 
2015 World Press Photo “Black Gold Hotel” 1st Prize Daily Life, Stories

References

External links

Interview with Michele Palazzi on Wired.com
Video interview with Michele Palazzi at World Press Photo
Interview with Michele Palazzi on CNN.com
Interview with Michele Palazzi on LensCulture
Interview with Michele Palazzi on DOMUS
Video interview with Michele Palazzi by the Italian Ministry of Foreign Affairs

1984 births
Living people
Italian photographers